Ron Fogarty is a Canadian ice hockey head coach and former player who is currently in charge of the men's program at Princeton.

Career
Fogarty started his college career as a player for Colgate in 1991. He spent four years with the program, serving as team captain in his senior season. After graduating Fogarty spent one year with the Memphis Riverkings before returning to his alma mater as an assistant coach. He spent three more years with the Red Raiders before accepting a similar position with Clarkson and eventually Bowling Green.

In 2006 Fogarty was selected as the first head coach for Division III Adrian College men's team and spent the next season as a player-coach for the Petrolia Squires of the Western Ontario Senior League while Adrian's facility was being completed. The Bulldogs hit the ground running under Fogarty compiling a 26-3 record in their first season, winning both the conference and conference tournament titles, but failed to be selected for the NCAA tournament. They repeated the same feat in each of the following three seasons and were finally allowed into the national postseason in their third year. Fogarty's fourth campaign with the Bulldogs saw the program reach the national title game, falling to #1-seeded St. Norbert 4-3. Fogarty coached at Adrian for three more years and never failed to get his team to record at least 20 wins in a season.

Fogarty left the Bulldogs in 2014 when he was offered the head coaching job at Princeton. The Tigers had fallen in the standings over the previous three seasons and that trend continued in Fogarty's first two years with the team managing only 4 and 5 wins. His third season saw a large improvement with the team tripling its win total from the year before and through the Tigers failed to post a winning season it was their best performance since Guy Gadowsky left in 2011.

College Head Coaching record

References

External links

1972 births
Living people
Colgate Raiders men's ice hockey players
Ice hockey people from Ontario
Memphis RiverKings players
New Jersey Rockin' Rollers players
Ottawa Loggers players
Philadelphia Bulldogs players
Princeton Tigers men's ice hockey coaches
Sportspeople from Sarnia
Canadian ice hockey centres